The Rhinebeck and Connecticut Railroad was chartered on June 29, 1870 for the purpose of building a railroad from Rhinecliff on the Hudson River east to the Connecticut state line. Construction started on the line in 1872.
The following is a list of the owners and lessees of the line.
 1882 - Hartford and Connecticut Western Railroad
 1889 - Central New England and Western Railroad
 1892 - Philadelphia, Reading and New England Railroad
 1899 - Central New England Railway
 1927 - New York, New Haven and Hartford Railroad

Passenger service was ended in 1933 and the line was abandoned in 1938.

Station listing

References

External links
Rhinebeck and Connecticut Railroad (KinglyHeirs; Central New England Railroad page)
Railroad and County Map of New York - 1888

Defunct New York (state) railroads
Companies affiliated with the Central New England Railway
Predecessors of the New York, New Haven and Hartford Railroad
Railway companies established in 1870
Railway companies disestablished in 1882
American companies disestablished in 1882
American companies established in 1870